Etela Rajender (born 20 March 1964) is an Indian politician from Telangana. He served as the first Finance Minister of Telangana state from 2014 to 2018 and as the Health Minister of Telangana from 2019 to 2021. 

Etela represented Kamalapur Assembly constituency from 2004 to 2010 and Huzurabad assembly constituency since 2010 in the Andhra Pradesh Legislative Assembly and Telangana Legislative Assembly from the Telangana Rashtra Samithi (TRS) party. In 2021, he joined Bharatiya Janata Party (BJP) and was re-elected as an MLA in the by election.

Political career
Etela joined TRS in 2003. He is recognised as a student leader with a left-wing ideology.

He was elected as the Member of the Legislative Assembly (MLA) from Kamalapur Assembly constituency in the 2004 Andhra Pradesh Legislative Assembly election. He defeated the incumbent MLA Muddasani Damodar Reddy. He served as the TRS floor leader in the Andhra Pradesh Legislative Assembly. He resigned as the MLA in 2008 and was re-elected as an MLA from the Kamalapur constituency in the 2008 by-election.

In 2009, the Kamalapur constituency was merged with Huzurabad Assembly constituency. He contested the 2009 Andhra Pradesh Legislative Assembly election from Huzurabad constituency and won as the MLA. In 2010 he resigned as the MLA and won the by-election.

In 2014, he was appointed the Finance Minister of Telangana in the first K. Chandrashekar Rao ministry, and served until 2018.

He contested the 2018 Telangana Legislative Assembly election and was re-elected as the MLA from Huzurabad constituency. In 2019, he took oath as the Minister of Health for Telangana. As part of the 2018 election's declaration of assets by contestants, he has furnished  in assets and was the richest among other ministers.

In May 2021, Etela, along with his followers and Jamuna Hatcheries, faced allegations of land encroachments in Achampet and Hakimpet villages in Medak district. His ministerial portfolio was removed and he was subsequently dismissed from the state cabinet. Subsequently on 4 June, he resigned from TRS. On 12 June, he resigned as MLA.

On 14 June 2021, Etela joined the BJP in the presence of BJP leaders Dharmendra Pradhan and G. Kishan Reddy. He has also resigned as the president of Nampally Exhibition Society, which he held since 2014. He contested the by-election held later that year and won as the MLA.

Member of Legislative Assembly

Personal life 
Etela was born on 20 March 1964 into a Mudiraju family in Kamalapur, Hanumakonda district of present-day Telangana. He has studied B.Sc. from Osmania University in 1984. He married Jamuna, who owns Jamuna Hatcheries. The couple has two children, a son and a daughter.

References

1964 births
Living people
Telangana MLAs 2014–2018
Telangana Rashtra Samithi politicians
Telugu people
People from Medak
State cabinet ministers of Telangana
Telangana MLAs 2018–2023
Andhra Pradesh MLAs 2009–2014
Andhra Pradesh MLAs 2004–2009
People from Karimnagar district
Bharatiya Janata Party politicians from Telangana
Osmania University alumni